The Bohemia national ice hockey team was the national ice hockey team of the Kingdom of Bohemia, a kingdom within Austria-Hungary. The team competed between 1909 and 1914 playing in four European Championships. Playing its last game in 1914, the team was succeeded by the Czechoslovakia men's national ice hockey team after the Kingdom of Bohemia was dissolved and became part of the First Czechoslovak Republic.

History

Bohemia played its first game in 1909 against France during the Chamonix Cup which was being held in Chamonix, France. Bohemia lost the game 1–8 and lost all of their three other games at the tournament against Belgium, England and Switzerland. During the tournament the team's 0–11 loss against England would be recorded as the team's largest ever loss in international participation. The following year Bohemia announced their intention to participate in the inaugural European Championships being held in Les Avants, Switzerland however withdrew due to a lack of training. In 1911, Bohemia participated in the 1911 European Championship being held in Berlin, German Empire. Bohemia won the tournament after winning all three of their games and finishing on top of the standings. During the tournament, they also achieved their largest ever win in international participation when they beat Switzerland 13–0. The following year Bohemia, this time being represented by the club team HC Slavia Praha, again won gold at the European Championships however the tournament was annulled by the Ligue Internationale de Hockey sur Glace (LIHG) congress due to Austria not being affiliated with the LIHG at the time of the tournament. During the 1913 European Championship, Bohemia finished second behind Belgium who won their first title. In 1914, Bohemia competed in an exhibition game against Germany in Montreux, Switzerland. Germany won the game 4–2 and recorded their first and only win over Bohemia. A month later, Bohemia competed in their last European Championship. Being represented again by HC Slavia Praha, Bohemia went on to win their third Championship in four years after winning both of their games and finishing on top the standings.

After playing their last game in 1914, the Bohemian national team was succeeded by the Czechoslovakia men's national ice hockey team after the Kingdom of Bohemia was dissolved and became part of the First Czechoslovak Republic

International competitions
1909 Chamonix Cup; Chamonix, France. Finish: 5th
1911 European Championship; Berlin, German Empire. Finish: Won gold medal
1912 European Championship; Prague, Austria-Hungary. Finish: Won gold medal
1913 European Championship; Munich, German Empire. Finish: Won silver medal
1914 European Championship; Berlin, German Empire. Finish: Won gold medal

European Championship record

1912 Championship was later annulled because Austria was not a member of the IIHF at the time of the competition.

All-time Record against other nations
Source

Notes
 Result was annulled due to Austria not being a member of the Ligue Internationale de Hockey sur Glace at the time.

References

Former national ice hockey teams
Sport in the Kingdom of Bohemia
Sport in Austria-Hungary